Heidi Skjeggestad (born 28 January 1970) is a Norwegian former speed skater.

Her achievements include two victories at the Norwegian Allround Championships, in 1989 and 1990. She competed in the World Allround Speed Skating Championships for Women in 1990.

References

External links

1970 births
Living people
Norwegian female speed skaters